The Great Central Railway (GCR) Class 9A was a class of 0-6-2T steam locomotive built between 1889 and 1892. From 1923 the locomotives were redesignated Class N4.

Design and construction
Designed by Thomas Parker for the Manchester, Sheffield and Lincolnshire Railway (MS&LR), a total of 55 locomotives were constructed up to 1892. The MS&LR changed its name to the GCR in 1897. This last batch was classified as Class 9A Altered, sometimes abbreviated as 9A Alt.

The GCR 9A locos were reclassified as N4 under the LNER locomotive numbering and classification system when the GCR was absorbed into the London and North Eastern Railway after the 1923 grouping. The original design were N4/1 and those with extended bunkers N4/2.

In 1925, shorter chimneys began to be fitted to bring the N4s within the LNER composite loading gauge, creating two further variants N4/2 (short bunker) – the existing N4/2s being recoded as N4/3s – and N4/4 (long bunker).

Locomotive numbering
They were built in three batches and numbered 161, 165, 173 (later renumbered 512–514), 601–638, and 712–725. GCR locos had 5000 added to their original numbers when the line was absorbed by the LNER in 1923, resulting in numbers ranging between 5512 and 5725. As part of the LNER's numbering rationalisation scheme introduced in 1946, the surviving 22 N4s were renumbered between 9225 and 9247 with the earliest built receiving the lowest number, and so on. British Railways, formed on 1 January 1948, added 60000 to all LNER loco numbers.

References

External links 

 LNER encyclopedia

09A
0-6-2T locomotives
Railway locomotives introduced in 1889
Neilson locomotives
Scrapped locomotives
Standard gauge steam locomotives of Great Britain